BB12 may refer to:

 BB12, a postcode district in the BB postcode area
Big Brother 12, a television programme in various versions